is a railway station located in Nakama, Fukuoka.

Lines 

Chikuhō Electric Railroad
Chikuhō Electric Railroad Line

Platforms

Adjacent stations

Surrounding area
 Chikuhō Electric Railroad Head Office
 Nishitetsu Bus stop
 Fukuoka Hibiki Bank Nakama Branch
 Nishi-Nippon City Bank Nakama Branch
 Izutsuya Nakama shop
 Aeon Nakama Supermarket
 Nakamatōritani Post Office
 Nakama Harmony Hall
 Shinnakama Hospital
 Nakama City Hospital
 Taga Shrine

Railway stations in Fukuoka Prefecture
Railway stations in Japan opened in 1964